The list of disasters in Vietnam by death toll includes major disasters and accidents - excluding warfare and other intentional acts - that took place on Vietnamese soil and resulted in 10 or more fatalities:

List

References 

Vietnam
Disasters in Vietnam
Lists of events in Vietnam
Vietnam